Gret or GRET may refer to:

 , a Russian coastal tanker
 Groupe de Recherches et d'Echanges Technologiques (acronym: GRET)
 Gret Palucca (1902–1993), German dancer and teacher
 Gret Loewensberg (born 1943), Swiss architect
 Eugenio Gret (1901–?), Argentine cyclist

See also 
 Dull Gret, Anglicized version of Dulle Griet, a figure of Flemish folklore